Mary Isabel da Cuña Rodríguez (25 November 1942 – 24 September 2016) was a Uruguayan actress and theater director.

Biography
Her professional debut was in 1971.

She worked under directors such as Sergio Otermin, Villanueva Cosse, Jorge Denevi, Carlos Aguilera, Alberto Rivero, Gloria Levy, and Ruben Coletto. She acted in works by Shakespeare, Woody Allen, Michael Frayn, Neil Simon, George Tabori, Harold Pinter, and Copi.

In 1975 da Cuña became the first woman to be part of a murga performance in the official contest, when she joined Los Diablos Verdes.

In television she was one of the most visible faces of the comic programs  (where she worked on its second stage with Roberto Jones, and Imilce Viñas) and Plop!

In 1990 she began working as a teacher at Eduardo Ramírez's School of Dance, the La Gaviota School of Theater, the School of Musical Comedy, and her own school of acting training.

She won the 2005  for best actress for the work Raspando la cruz by Rafael Spregelburd, and received seven other Florencio nominations.

Her state of health led her to stop acting and focus on theater direction. She died at age 73, due to the aftermath of a prolonged vasculitis, and was buried in the Cementerio del Norte, Montevideo.

She was divorced from actor and theater director Jorge Denevi, with whom she had a daughter, actress Julieta Denevi.

References

1942 births
2016 deaths
20th-century Uruguayan actresses
21st-century Uruguayan actresses
Actresses from Montevideo
Uruguayan educators
Uruguayan stage actresses
Uruguayan television actresses
Uruguayan theatre directors
Uruguayan women educators
Women theatre directors
Deaths from vasculitis
Burials at the Cementerio del Norte, Montevideo